American Idol Rewind is a syndicated television series that ran from September 30, 2006 to May 15, 2010. The hour-long weekly series was a repurposed edition of the hit reality talent show American Idol, featuring present day interviews with the contestants, semi-finalists and rejected auditioners in addition to extra audition, Hollywood Week, and finals footage never previously aired. It featured the first five seasons of the original series.

In August 2006, the series was cleared for broadcast on stations in over 96 percent of the United States. In addition to local stations (including the cable-only CW Plus group of stations), the program formerly aired nationally over cable channel Superstation WGN/WGN America.

Starting Fall 2008, American Idol Rewind started airing encores a week later on TV Guide Network.

Distributors
Until December 2007, "Rewind" was syndicated by Tribune Entertainment, which began a quick departure from the industry on December 18, 2007 as part of Tribune Company's oncoming bankruptcy. As a result, its  programs were being forced to find new distributors for their shows. Almost immediately after the closedown, American Idol's producers, FremantleMedia, transferred syndication and distribution to Trifecta Entertainment & Media.

Season 1 (2006-2007)
The first season highlighted the same season of the original series.

A highlight of the audition episodes was the first-ever screening of Kelly Clarkson's full audition in Dallas, which never aired in the original run of the show. On the episode aired the weekend of October 14–15, Clarkson singing a portion of Madonna's "Express Yourself" was shown.

Brian Dunkleman, who was co-host with Ryan Seacrest season one but left under sour terms, adds new commentary.

Season 2 (2007-2008)
The second season showcased the same season of the original series. The second season, described by the show's producers as "the year that put American Idol on the map with legendary talent and unprecedented ratings," introduced Ruben Studdard (winner), Clay Aiken (runner-up), Kimberley Locke, and Josh Gracin. Aiken provides the narration for this set of episodes.

Season 3 & 4 (2008-2009)
The third edition of "Rewind" highlighted both the Third and Fourth Seasons of the original series. The first half showcased Season 3, where Fantasia Barrino won and Jennifer Hudson and Jasmine Trias were finalists, and the second half  showcased Season 4 where Carrie Underwood was the winner.

Due to copyright laws, the show was unable to get rights to air full-length performances from Season Three which is why they bundled up 16 weeks of the show in 3 weeks.

Jason Kennedy narrates.

Season 5 (2009-2010)
The fourth edition of Rewind featured the fifth season of American Idol, where Taylor Hicks won and Chris Daughtry was a finalist. Jason Kennedy returns to narrate.

The series was quietly canceled after the final episodes aired in May 2010.

Episodes

References

External links
 

2006 American television series debuts
2010 American television series endings
2000s American reality television series
2010s American reality television series
Rewind
English-language television shows
First-run syndicated television programs in the United States
Television series by Tribune Entertainment